Luka Maksimović (born 17 July 1991) is a Serbian comedian and political activist best known for his role as the satirical fictional politician named Ljubiša Preletačević "Beli". He was formerly the leader of a parody political party Sarmu probo nisi (SPN) formed in Mladenovac in 2016.

His party participated in the 2016 local council election in the municipality of Mladenovac, winning 20 percent of the votes and 12 seats. He participated in the 2017 Serbian presidential election under his Preletačević persona, finishing third with 9.44% of the votes. In 2018, Maksimović left the "party".

Name
The surname "Preletačević" is a humorous pun. The word preletač (similar to "defector") is used in Serbian language for a politician who switches political parties for personal gains. The nickname "Beli" means "The white" in Serbian.

Biography
Maksimović was born in 1991 in Velika Ivanča, Mladenovac. He is a communicology student.

2016 local election
Sarmu probo nisi (SPN) started as a fictional political party created by a group of comedians from Mladenovac. They became popular after they filmed a humorous parody promotional video for their fictional leader "Ljubiša Preletačević Beli". After the video became popular on YouTube, they were persuaded by their followers to participate in the election. The group vowed to make a lot of false promises and false hope. The focal point of their campaign was the promise to open a euthanasia department for pensioners in the local hospital in order to spare the country of their expenses.

Local council elections were held in the most municipalities and cities in Serbia on 24 April 2016, together with the 2016 parliamentary election. Maksimović and his followers formed a parody political party called Sarmu probo nisi (SPN) and participated in the local election in the Municipality of Mladenovac. Because SPN is not officially registered as political party, they participated as an independent list called "Beli - Samo jako" (Beli - Go hard!). This list surprisingly won 20% of the votes and 12 seats, becoming the second strongest group in the local council of Mladenovac, behind only the ruling Serbian Progressive Party.

2017 presidential election
Maksimović launched his campaign for the 2017 Serbian presidential election on 4 March 2017. He campaigns under his Preletačević persona with the political slogan "Samo jako!" (Go hard!). Saša Radulović, one of the Serbian parliamentary opposition leaders, supported his campaign, saying that his candidacy will contribute to the raise of the turnout in the first round of the elections, thus preventing the Prime Minister and ruling party presidential candidate Aleksandar Vučić from achieving more than 50 percent of the votes, and forcing the runoff; Maksimović also said that this is one of his main reasons for the candidacy.

On 11 March 2017, Maksimović announced that he collected 10,000 signatures of support needed for candidacy. On 13 March, national Electoral Commission officially declared his candidacy for the presidency. Despite running as a joke candidate, he finished the election in the third place, winning 326,055 or 9.44% of the votes cast.

Platform 
The Beli platform was entirely humorous and tongue-in-cheek. Some prominent campaign promises included building a Serbian coastline and constructing hills in Pančevo so that residents could sled in the wintertime. He would tell voters that he would offer "three times as much" as the other candidates. He noted that he supported universal employment, increased pensions for all people, and endorsed "uniting" the Balkans to become a superpower.

2018 local election
In early 2018, Maksimović announced that he will participate at the March 2018 local election for the Assembly of the City of Belgrade with new group of supporter, leaving Sarmu probo nisi (a.k.a. "Beli - samo jako" movement). Subsequently, the movement dissociated itself from Maksimović.

At the March 2018 local election, Maskimović participated with an electoral list named "Ljubiša Preletačević Beli - Zato što volimo Belovgrad". Electoral commission refused to approve his list without permission from a person whose name is used (although there was no person with that name at that moment). After that, it was reported that that same day Maksimović's cousin Ognjen Maksimović legally changed his name to "Ljubiša Preletačević Beli" and gave written permission for his name to be used on the electoral list. After that, electoral commission approved the list. Some political commentators and opponents criticized this unusually quick name changing procedure and accused Maksimović for secretly working for the ruling party. Luka Maksimović dismissed those accusations and said that his cousin already filed a request for name change two weeks earlier.

References

External links
 

1991 births
Living people
People from Mladenovac
Fictional politicians
Serbian political activists
Candidates for President of Serbia